Nigina Abduraimova and Venise Chan were the defending champions, having won the event in 2012, but both decided not to compete in 2013.

Han Na-lae and Yoo Mi won the tournament, defeating Kim Sun-jung and Yu Min-hwa in the all-Korean final, 2–6, 6–3, [10–6].

Seeds

Draw

References 
 Draw

Samsung Securities Cup - Women's Doubles
2013 Women's Doubles